Hao Shuai (born October 1, 1983 in Tianjin) is a Chinese table tennis player.

Career records
Singles (as of May 13, 2010)
World Championships: QF (2005, 2007).
Pro Tour winner (3): Serbian Open 2007. China (Shanghai) Open 2008. Slovenian Open 2009. Runner-up (3): Malaysia Open 2003. China (Tianjin), Korea Open 2009.
Pro Tour Grand Finals appearances: 3. Record: runner-up (2003).
Asian Championships: SF (2005).
Asian Cup: 2nd (2000, 2005).

Men's doubles
World Championships: SF (2009).
Pro Tour winner (5): Slovenian, China (Guangzhou) Open 2006. China (Tianjin), Korea Open 2009. German Open 2011. Runner-up (5): Japan Open 2003. China (Kunshan) Open 2006. Kuwait, Qatar Open 2009. German Open 2010.
Pro Tour Grand Finals appearances: 3. Record: winner (2006). SF (2003, 2007).
Asian Championships: winner (2007).

Mixed doubles
World Championships: Runner-up (2011). SF (2009).
Asian Championships: QF (2005, 2007).

Teams
Asian Games: winner (2006)
Asian Championships: winner (2005, 2007).

References

Chinese male table tennis players
Living people
1983 births
Table tennis players from Tianjin
Table tennis players at the 2006 Asian Games
Asian Games medalists in table tennis
Medalists at the 2006 Asian Games
Asian Games gold medalists for China
World Table Tennis Championships medalists